Ann Johnston (April 18, 1936 – May 26, 2022) was a Canadian figure skater. She was the 1955 and 1956 Canadian silver medalist. She represented Canada at the 1956 Winter Olympics, where she placed ninth.

Results

 J = Junior level

References

External links 
 
 

1936 births
2022 deaths
Canadian female single skaters
Figure skaters at the 1956 Winter Olympics
Olympic figure skaters of Canada
Figure skaters from Toronto